1-800 Vindication is the sixth album by Danish death metal band Illdisposed. The clean vocals were performed by producer and former Hatesphere guitarist Peter Siegfridsen.

Reception
In 2005, 1-800 Vindication was ranked number 490 in Rock Hard magazine's book of The 500 Greatest Rock & Metal Albums of All Time.

Track listing
All music written by Illdisposed, lyrics written by Bo Summer

Personnel

 Bo Summer - vocals
 Jakob Hansen - guitar
 Lasse Bak - guitar
 Jonas Mikkelsen - bass
 Thomas Jensen - drums

 Additional writing credits: Peter Siegfridsen, Tore Mogensen
 Clean vocals performed by Peter Siegfridsen 
 Keyboards by the K9 Agency
 Additional synths by Jonas Friis

References 

Illdisposed albums
2004 albums
Roadrunner Records albums
Massacre Records albums